Wabash Township is one of fifteen townships in Clark County, Illinois, USA.  As of the 2010 census, its population was 2,257 and it contained 1,033 housing units.

Geography

Cities, towns, villages
 Marshall (east quarter)

Unincorporated towns
 Dennison
 Farrington
 Fox Run
 Golf Lakes
 Griffin (historical)
 Livingston
 McKeen
 Weaver
(This list is based on USGS data and may include former settlements.)

Cemeteries
The township contains these eleven cemeteries: Asbury, Big Creek, Black, Cumberland, Dean, Dennison, Farris, Liffick, Livingston, Mackey and Thompson.

Major highways
  Interstate 70
  U.S. Route 40
  Illinois Route 1

Airports and landing strips
 Kibler Airport

Demographics

School districts
 Marshall Community Unit School District #C-2

Political districts
 Illinois's 15th congressional district
 State House District 109
 State Senate District 55

References

 United States Census Bureau 2007 TIGER/Line Shapefiles
 United States National Atlas

External links
 City-Data.com
 Illinois State Archives

Townships in Clark County, Illinois
Townships in Illinois